Otto Elfeldt (10 October 1895 – 23 October 1982) was a German general during World War II and a POW at Trent Park. He was also a recipient of the German Cross in Gold of Nazi Germany.

Career 
He was commander of the 302nd Infantry Division in 1943, with which he fought at Voroshilovgrad, the Mius River and Zaporizhia. In December 1943, he became commander of the 165th Reserve Division in Belgium and in February 1944 of the 47th Infantry Division in France.

On 30 July 1944, he took over command of the LXXXIV Army Corps from Dietrich von Choltitz, but his Corps was surrounded and destroyed in the Falaise Pocket.

Eltfeldt was taken prisoner near Saint Lambert and held in Trent Park and Island Farm Special Camp until his release in January 1948.

Sources 
Traces of War
Trent Park

1895 births
1982 deaths
Lieutenant generals of the German Army (Wehrmacht)
People from Mecklenburg
German Army personnel of World War I
Reichswehr personnel
German prisoners of war in World War II held by the United Kingdom
People from Vorpommern-Rügen
Military personnel from Mecklenburg-Western Pomerania
Recipients of the Gold German Cross
German Army generals of World War II